The Gallery & Palace is a residential skyscraper complex located in Luzhu District, Taoyuan City, Taiwan. The complex comprises two skyscraper buildings completed in 2006, with a height of  that comprise 29 floors above ground, as well as 3 basement levels.  The complex contains 188 apartment units. As of December 2021, they are the tallest buildings in Luzhu District and 6th tallest in Taoyuan City. Facilities of the condominium include two swimming pools, sauna rooms, gymnasiums, as well as entertainment and leisure facilities, such as billiard rooms, badminton and squash courts, and yoga rooms.

See also 
 List of tallest buildings in Taiwan
 List of tallest buildings in Taoyuan City
 ChungYuet Royal Landmark

References

2006 establishments in Taiwan
Residential skyscrapers in Taiwan
Skyscrapers in Taoyuan
Buildings and structures in Taoyuan City
Apartment buildings in Taiwan
Residential buildings completed in 2006
Neoclassical architecture in Taiwan